Think About Life is self-titled debut album by Think About Life.

Track listing
"Paul Cries" – 3:15
"Bastian and the Boar" – 2:27
"Commander Riker's Party" – 2:54
"Fireworks" – 2:54
"Money" – 4:52
"In Her Hands" – 3:04
"Serious Chords" – 3:14
"What the Future Might Be" (feat. Subtitle) – 2:28
"(slow-motion slam-dunk from the free-throw line)" – 1:37
"The Blue Sun" – 7:53

Personnel
Martin Cesar – Vocals (Drums on "The Blue Sun")
Graham Van Pelt – Keyboards / Vocals
Matt Shane – Drums (Vocals on "The Blue Sun")
Subtitle – Guest vocals on "What the Future Might Be"
Chloe Lum – Guest noises on "Commander Riker's Party" and "In Her Hands"
Gordon Krieger - clarinet on "Money"

External links
Think About Life at Alien8 Recordings.

References 

Think About Life albums
2006 albums
Alien8 Recordings albums